Françoise Levechin-Gangloff (born 1950) is a French classical organist, titular of the great organ of the Saint-Roch church in Paris, professor at the Conservatoire de Paris - CNSMDP and at the Schola cantorum - and President of the International Conservatory of Music in Paris - CIMP.

She studied Piano, Sight-reading, harpsichord, composition and Organ at the Conservatoire de Paris and musicology at the Sorbonne. She studied the Organ with Gaston Litaize and Rolande Falcinelli.

References

French classical organists
Women organists
Living people
Conservatoire de Paris alumni
Academic staff of the Conservatoire de Paris
Women music educators
21st-century organists
21st-century French women musicians
1950 births